Juansher Burtchuladze (born 14 January 1976) is a Georgian politician who has been Minister of Defence in the Second Garibashvili government since 22 February 2021.

Biography 
In 1998-1999, he was an intern at the Department of American Countries of the Ministry of Foreign Affairs of Georgia. In the early years of the decade, he was an economist at the National Bank of Georgia. From 2010-2015, he was a financial manager at the Embassy of Georgia in the US.

In addition to his native Georgian, he speaks fluent English, Turkish, Russian and Spanish.

References 

1976 births
Living people
21st-century politicians from Georgia (country)
Defense ministers of Georgia